Said Gilani (born 5 February 1996) is an Afghan athlete. He competed in the men's 100 metres event at the 2017 and 2019 World Athletics Championships. In 2019, he competed in the preliminary round and he did not advance to compete in the heats.

References

External links
 

1996 births
Living people
Afghan male sprinters
Place of birth missing (living people)
World Athletics Championships athletes for Afghanistan